Mustafa Barghouti (born 1 January 1954) is a Palestinian physician, activist, and politician who serves as General Secretary of the Palestinian National Initiative (PNI), also known as al Mubadara. He has been a member of the Palestinian Legislative Council since 2006 and is also a member of the Palestine Liberation Organization (PLO) Central Council. In 2007, Barghouti was Minister of Information in the Palestinian unity government.

Early life and education
Barghouti's family is from Bani Zeid, a village about 15 miles northwest of Ramallah, neit Birzeit. He grew up in Ramallah and his father was the municipal engineer for the nearby village of Al-Bireh. Barghouti has said that his family "has always been very political, very active," noting that under the Mandate, his grandfather and great-uncle "were jailed by the British." He has said that he "grew up surrounded by internationalist, progressive literature," and has described his family's politics as always being "shaped by opposition to social injustice, rather than by nationalism." His father, he has noted, "used to speak to us of his Jewish comrades in Tiberias or Acre."

One source has described him as being born in Bait Rima on the West Bank, although Barghouti himself has said that he was born in Jerusalem.

He has said that he was "reshaped" by the Six-Day War. "I felt a huge amount of responsibility. My childhood ended then. We were now under occupation. It was the beginning of a life mission: how do we become free? The feeling of injustice was very strong. Though still a child, I felt the whole world sitting on my shoulders…. Some gave in to defeatism—Nasser had it wrong, it was better to adopt a pro-American stance—but our position was: no, we have to resist, but in a stronger, better way. I've never felt I was fighting for the liberation of the Palestinian people on purely nationalistic grounds, one people against another. It was a fight against oppression, against occupation."

Barghouti is a distant cousin of Marwan Barghouti, who is the Secretary General of Fatah West Bank.

He has said that he was "very active" as a student activist on the West Bank. In 1971, he went to Moscow to study medicine and spent seven years there completing his medical training.

Career
Returning home in 1978, he "specialized in internal medicine and cardiology at Maqased Hospital in Jerusalem." At that time he was active in the Palestinian Communist Party, "part of a new form of resistance to the Occupation that developed after Jordan crushed the Palestinians during the 'Black September' of 1970."

After the signing of the Camp David Accords, Barghouti said, he and his comrades "realized...that we couldn't rely on Egypt, Syria or any other country, that we could expect nothing from outside. We would have to be self-reliant, self-organized. Resistance would have to mean defying the Occupation, defying the Israeli rules."

While he was at Maqased, he and "five or six" medical colleagues founded Medical Relief (MR), a volunteer organization that has developed into "a whole network of primary health-care centres, mobile clinics and outreach programmes." By 1986, "there were MR committees all over the Occupied Territories, including Gaza."

He pursued further studies in Jerusalem, then received an MSc. in Business Administration and Management from Stanford University.

He served as Secretary-General of the Palestinian People's Party (formerly the Communist Party) and represented it in the Palestinian National Council, the legislative body of the PLO, until his resignation from the PPP in 2002. He stood for election in the 1996 PLC elections, running as a candidate in the Ramallah district, but lost out narrowly after a recount.

Barghouti is the President of the Union of Palestinian Medical Relief Committees, an NGO that provides health and community services to people in the Occupied Territories. He is also Director of the Health Development Information and Policy Institute, an independent Ramallah-based think-tank that engages in policy research and planning for the Palestinian health-care system in the West Bank and Gaza Strip.

In addition, he was one of the founders, in October 2001, of Grassroots International Protection for the Palestinian People, a program that seeks to protect Palestinians, including those engaged in nonviolent protest, by arranging for international civilian witnesses to be present at potentially violent encounters between Palestinians and settlers or members of the IDF.

Barghouti is also an associate of the Oxford Research Group.

Barghouti was nominated for a Nobel Peace Prize in 2010 by Mairead Maguire, who had won the prize in 1976.

Madrid Conference of 1991
In 1991, Barghouti was a delegate to the Madrid Conference, which was held with the aim of ending the Israeli–Palestinian conflict and the First Intifada. In 1996, he ran unsuccessfully as a candidate for a legislative seat in the first Palestinian Authority elections. In 2002 Barghouti left the Palestinian People's Party. In June 2002, Barghouti, Haidar Abdel-Shafi, Ibrahim Dakkak and Edward Said established the Palestinian National Initiative (al-Mubadara al-Wataniyya al-Filistiniyya), an attempt to build a reformist, inclusive alternative to both the established Palestine Liberation Organization and to Islamic militant groups such as Hamas. Barghouti currently serves as the Initiative's general secretary.

He later said that the PLO had "panicked at the thought" that Hanan Ashrawi and Haidar Abd al-Shafi "might assume the leadership of the Palestine national movement." At Madrid, he has said, "we sought to consolidate Palestinian unity—it was crucial that Israel should not succeed in erecting a wall between internal and external representatives." He has complained that "Oslo was decided behind the back of the Palestinian delegation to Madrid, and by extension, behind the back of the Palestinian people." He has described the Oslo negotiations as "a technical and political disaster," complaining that while "the Madrid team had been well briefed and had 600 experts at its disposal, the PLO's Oslo negotiations were conducted by amateurs." Israel, he has said, took "gross advantage of the naïvety of the Palestinian negotiators," but the result was "so disastrous, so unjust, that even the signatories couldn't make it stick....This is why democracy is so important in these cases: because it renders the negotiators accountable to the people, answerable for every document they sign."

He has said that after 1993, he and his "were conducting a struggle on two fronts," against the Israeli Occupation and against the Palestinian Authority. "Not only were our leaders completely inept at negotiating with Israel, but they were rapidly transforming themselves into a gigantic security apparatus…consuming 34 per cent of the budget." The PA, he has complained, "has functioned along the same lines as the totalitarian Arab governments that gave it refuge," trying "to control every aspect of life."

Palestinian National Initiative
In June 2002, Barghouti co-founded the Palestinian National Initiative (PNI), and is currently its Secretary-General.

Barghouti has explained that the PNI's "origins lie in the uprising of September 2000." When the Second Intifada broke out, "we were in the streets arguing that this was the Independence Intifada—whereas Hamas called it the Al-Aqsa Intifada." The leaders of the PPP, he charged, "didn't understand the importance of this distinction, this affirmation of secularity." Accordingly, Barghouti decided that the time was ripe "to found an alternative democratic opposition without the Party," and to that end he "got in touch with Abd al-Shafi, Ibrahim Dakkak and Edward Said, who became a very close friend during his last years." Barghouti's goal was to bring about "a renaissance of the Palestinian movement, on a footing that the outside world could understand."

The PNI's manifesto, issued in October 2000, presented "a secular programme for a non-violent, non-militarized Intifada, signed by 10,000 supporters." The organization, however, was not officially established until June 2002, "at the time of the Israeli re-invasion." When its founding was announced, "Five hundred major figures joined us immediately" and "Arafat offered me a ministerial post in his government. He put pressure on the PPP, which in turn pressured me to accept. So in April 2003, I resigned from the Party."

Also known as al Mubadara (sometimes spelled Almubadarah), the PNI opposes the Israeli Occupation, calls for a Palestinian state, and supports the Palestinian right of return. Among the PNI's stated objectives are the establishment of a united Palestinian leadership, the promotion of democracy in the Occupied Territories, and the strengthening of contacts between Palestinians in the Territories and those abroad. It describes itself as focusing on the release of prisoners and detainees in Israeli jails, mobilizing Palestinians in the Occupied Territories and abroad, empowering civil-society organizations, and building international support for the Palestinian cause. The group's ultimate goal is to establish an independent Palestinian state that is secure, free, and governed according to the rule of law.
 
Barghouti describes the PNI as "a democratic coalition" that is open to the whole range of secular left-wing individuals and groups—unions, the women's movement, civil-society organizations" and that seeks "to become an umbrella for various movements." It works jointly with the PFLP, with members of Fatah, and with religious Muslims "who are uncomfortable with fundamentalism because they are democrats."

The PNI's "one uncompromising rule" is that it "will only accept groups that are completely independent, both from Hamas and other fundamentalist movements, and from the Authority." It has also "worked with a variety of Israeli groups—Women in Black, Gush Shalom, Yesh Gvul, Ta'ayush—demonstrating against the invasion of Iraq or against the apartheid Wall." Its strategy, Barghouti has said, "is to try to link popular struggle against the Occupation with action on the ground designed to help people stay where they are—for if they stay, Israel has failed; whereas if they go, it's we who are defeated." It is important to the PNI both to provide "direct assistance" to Palestinians and to resists "the fundamentalists," Barghouti has said.

On 3 January 2003, he was arrested following an international press conference in East Jerusalem, on charges of disturbing the peace and entering the city illegally. During his detention, Barghouti was interrogated and suffered a broken knee, which, according to his account, was inflicted by blows from a rifle butt; he also reported that he received head injuries. He was released several days later.

Barghouti was detained on 3 January 2006 while campaigning in the Arab quarter of East Jerusalem and was taken for questioning to a local police station. A statement on his behalf read: "Dr Barghuthi was meeting with ordinary Jerusalemites near Damascus Gate, discussing their needs and the situation of Palestinians in east Jerusalem, when he was approached by six undercover Israeli security agents, arrested, and taken to the Russian Compound jail where he remains under detention."

In a 2012 interview, Barghouti emphasized that the PNI is committed to nonviolence, which "works better because it allows everybody, and not just a small group of people, to participate. It works better because it does not allow the Israelis to claim that they are victims in this conflict. It reveals and exposes them as they are in reality: the oppressors, the occupiers, and the creators of an apartheid system."

At a March 2013 press conference occasioned by US President Barack Obama's visit to the Occupied Territories, Barghouti, noting that Obama's stated goal was "to listen," protested that "We Palestinians have been listening for too long. This passivity on Obama's part is unacceptable and dangerous at a time when the two state solution is under risk." Barghouti also lamented that Obama would not be going to Hebron, "where the geographical segregation system is very clear," and said that, given comments made by Obama in his famous Cairo speech, Barghouti had expected that he would at least "issue severe condemnations against Israeli violence against Palestinians in nonviolent resistance protests" and "praise Palestinian nonviolence as we have stuck with that end." Barghouti was further disappointed that Obama, while visiting the graves of Yitzhak Rabin and Theodor Herzl, would not be visit Arafat's grave, and that he would be visiting the Eretz Israel Museum, which "contains stolen Palestinian artifacts."

2005 PNA presidential election
Barghouti announced on 29 November 2004 that he would be a candidate in the 9 January 2005 election to choose a successor to the just-deceased Yasser Arafat as President of the Palestinian National Authority. Barghouti was endorsed by his fellow PNI co-founder Dr. Haidar Abdel-Shafi. He became Mahmoud Abbas's main challenger after his cousin Marwan Barghouti, who was in jail for leading an uprising, withdrew from the race. Mustafa Barghouti, who was "widely seen as an outsider," campaigned on a platform of change and major PA reforms.

"People are fed up with the system, they are fed up with corruption, they are fed up with favouritism and people want change," he said at a campaign rally. He called for Israel to withdraw from the Gaza Strip, West Bank, and East Jerusalem, to release Palestinian prisoners, and to allow Palestinian refugees to return to their homes. He did not enjoy the backing of any major political party, however, and ended up losing to Abbas, receiving 19.8% of the vote. Conceding defeat, he said, "I feel very happy, and very proud" and said that he would win "next time." Referring to his role as head of the PNI, he said, "We are now the second most important political force in Palestine, ahead of Hamas. This is very, very important."

His campaign, he has said, "encountered huge obstacles: the prejudice of the world's media in favour of Mahmud Abbas (Abu Mazen), the illegal channelling of the PA's financial resources and its whole bureaucratic network in support of him, plus the massive endorsement from the Israelis and the Americans who, having made him their candidate, moved heaven and earth to impede our progress. Hamas's decision to boycott the elections also worked indirectly in favour of Abbas, for the movement's leaders instructed their militants not to vote for me." He has claimed that during his campaign he was "harassed by Israeli soldiers on seven occasions" and arrested twice; meanwhile, Arab TV stations "backed the Fatah candidate." Still, "we managed to bring together a solid democratic coalition" consisting of "the PFLP, independent unions, workers' committees, eminent figures of the democratic left such as Abd al-Shafi, moderate Islamists including Abd al-Sattar Qassem and many groupings from Palestinian civil society."

2009 Daily Show interview
Barghouti appeared on The Daily Show in October 2009 with fellow activist Anna Baltzer, telling Jon Stewart, "We are struggling for liberty. We are struggling for freedom. We are struggling for justice. It is Palestinians who have been subjected to the longest occupation in history and a system of subjugation that is totally unjust."

2010 Canadian visa incident
Barghouti was issued a visa too late for a 2010 Canadian lecture tour, forcing him to postpone his trip. His co-sponsor, Canadians for Justice and Peace in the Middle East (CJPME), accused the government of deliberately delaying the issuance of the visa. Frank Dimant, executive vice-president of B'nai B'rith Canada, said that his organization had not had anything to do with the visa delay, and that Barghouti's visit "was not an issue on the Jewish agenda." Barghouti was able to secure a visa to travel to Canada in May.

2012 tear-gas incident
Barghouti claimed that at the annual Land Day protest in Bethlehem in 2012, he was struck in the head by a canister of tear gas shot by Israeli forces. "I was hit with a tear-gas bomb on the side of my head and my back," Dr. Barghouti told a reporter from his hospital bed. "My scalp is injured, my right ear has problems, and they are checking to see if I have any spinal injury." An Israeli Defense spokesperson, however, said that he had been attacked by fellow Palestinian protesters.

The Jerusalem Post stated that witnesses reported that "scores of Fatah activists," not Israeli forces, had attacked Barghouti as part of a conflict between his supporters and Fatah "over who should lead the Land Day protests." Among the assailants, according to one witness, were "a number of PA security officers." Jerusalem Post also stated that witnesses maintained, moreover, that "the ambulance that took Barghouti from the scene was also attacked by angry Fatah activists."

After the attack, it was suggested that Fatah members may have attacked Barghouti because he had criticized it. "Fatah is like the Zionist Movement," Haaretz quoted one observer as saying. "It needs a common enemy and then it unites against it. That enemy is Mustafa Barghouti." One rumour suggested that the Syrian government had ordered Palestinian opposition groups to support Barghouti. It was also noted that some leftists were worried "that Barghouti has begun to attend the mosque and pepper his statements with quotes from religious sources."

Views
Barghouti has consistently criticized the PLO and Palestinian Authority for corruption. He supports non-violent resistance as the most effective means of overcoming Israeli occupation. According to a Reuters report, Barghouti "supports peace with Israel based on two states with a Palestinian state in all territory occupied by Israel in the 1967 Middle East war, a capital in Arab East Jerusalem and rights for refugees." He has indicated that recognition of a right of return is a must, but that this could likely be implemented in a way mutually acceptable to both sides.

In a December 2008 article, Barghouti condemned the ongoing Israeli "state terror," in which, he charged, over "290 people have been murdered." He said it was "time to expose the myths that they [the Israelis] have created." For example, he rejected the claim that Israel had "ended the occupation of the Gaza Strip in 2005," accusing it of intensifying its "military aggression," carrying out "frequent raids and targeted assassinations," and imposing "a comprehensive siege on the Strip," forcing Gazans to live "on the edge of starvation and without the most basic necessities of human life" and causing "a humanitarian catastrophe."

Barghouti has accused Fatah of damaging the Palestinian cause by engaging in militarization, by carrying out suicide attacks even as it condemns them, and by holding talks with the Israelis even as it condemns them. He has also said, in a 2005 interview, that Hamas, despite its radicalism, "should...be included in the democratic process, and invited to participate in elections," because "Violence, extremism, fundamentalism and suicide attacks are symptoms" of "occupation, oppression and injustice."

In the same interview, he admitted to being in contact with Hamas leaders. "We talk to them, try to persuade them to do this, not that. Hamas is much more than a breeding ground for kamikazes. It maintains a highly developed social network, and provides many services in health, housing and education, even if it does exploit them for political ends."

In December 2008, he dismissed the charge that Hamas had "violated the cease-fire and pulled out of it unilaterally," insisting that Hamas had "not carried out an unprovoked attack throughout the period of the cease-fire," while Israel had forced Gazans "to live like animals" and "killed 546 Palestinians, among them 76 children." He accused Israel of seeking, in its most recent actions, "to insure that casualties would be maximized and that the citizens of Gaza would be unprepared for their impending slaughter" and of using "war as an advertising showcase of its many instruments of death." He also denied that Israel had limited itself to military targets and that the violence in the region originated with the Palestinians, saying that the Israeli Occupation "has been and remains the root of violence between Israelis and Palestinians."

Barghouti called in 2009 for Israeli officers to be brought up on war-crime charges, saying that "Israel has killed 1,410 people, mostly unarmed civilians, including more than 400 children." He accused it of using "white phosphorus, dumdum bombs and others that released fragments that led to the maiming of hundreds of citizens, mostly children," and of targeting "schools, public institutions and civilian homes." He suggested that the International Criminal Court prosecute Israeli war criminals on the basis of the Goldstone Report and that the UN impose sanctions on Israel.

Writing about the Nakba in May 2013, Barghouti called on Israel "to recognize its responsibility for this crime, as a first step towards accountability and a just solution to this conflict." He accused Israel of "living in a state of denial," noting that its "textbooks don't recognize the rights of the Palestinian people or the Nakba." He rejected "Israel's traditional narrative and founding myth," which, he argued, is belied by the reality of "horrific massacres by Zionist militias...where even women, children, and elderly Palestinians were not spared." And he said that the Nakba "is not just a tragic moment in history" but "has been an ongoing process from that time against all of the Palestinian people."

He has said that there are two possible solutions to the Israeli–Palestinian conflict: "an independent Palestinian state" covering, at the very least, all the area within the 1967 frontiers, and with its capital in East Jerusalem, and with all settlements dismantled, or "a single democratic state," no longer exclusively Jewish, "in which all citizens are equal." He complains that Israel "has sought to trap the Palestinians into a corner of the chessboard where there's no longer any choice. If we agree on a two-state solution, we are offered bantustans. And if we say that in those conditions, we'd prefer a single, bi-national state, then we are accused of wanting to destroy Israel."

In a 2012 interview, Barghouti said he was convinced the peace process was "dead." In a March 2013 interview, he said that the peace process was "frozen with no prospects of peace on the horizon," and with "an unprecedented increase in Israeli settlements and land takeover throttling the idea of a Palestinian state." He also lamented "the intolerable economic situation," the "internal division between Fatah and Hamas," and "the humiliation that Palestinians are experiencing at the hands of settlers and also in encounters with Israelis inside Israel." Yet he said that he was given "great hope" by "the growing movement amongst people for non-violent resistance."

Boycott issue
Barghouti claimed in 2005 that the PNI did not support a boycott of Israel, while adding that it did call for sanctions against Israel, including "suspension of the EU–Israel accords...; stopping all military co-operation with Israel...; a halt to investment in Israel; [and] cutting off cultural relations at government level." Despite this claim, the PNI's website reported in 2012 that the group had "recently launched a new campaign, aiming to boycott Israeli products in West Bank supermarkets." Barghouti had led a group of protesters at a supermarket in the Atira district of in Ramallah, and said that "Shopkeepers are being great. We are convincing them to take away Israeli products and put Palestinian goods [in their place]."
   
In a 2012 interview, Barghouti affirmed his support for a multi-prong strategy to end the Israeli occupation of the West Bank. "Popular resistance," he said, "is a successful formula because it works both in the case of two states or one. In my opinion, the strategic choice before us is made up of four elements: the escalation of popular resistance, the BDS campaign, revamping all domestic and Palestinian economic policies to focus them on reinforcing the people's steadfastness instead of drowning them in debts, taxes and consumerism, rejecting the distinction between Areas A, B and C, and fourthly, national unity."

References

External links

The Palestinian National Initiative, English page
 Interview with Mustafa Barghouti on Radio France International International complicity helps Israeli "war crimes", says Barghouti
 BBC Profile: Mustafa Barghouti
 Speeches at University of Wisconsin–Madison (.mp3) (Spring 2006)
 60 Minutes episode Is Peace out of reach? featuring Mustafa Barghouti, reported by Bob Simon, January 26, 2009
 Part 1 of an interview on the Daily Show, with Anna Baltzer & Jon Stewart Part 2

1954 births
Living people
Palestinian Muslims
Nonviolence advocates
People from Jerusalem
Palestinian cardiologists
Palestinian democracy activists
Government ministers of the Palestinian National Authority
Stanford Graduate School of Business alumni
Peoples' Friendship University of Russia alumni
Palestinian People's Party politicians
Members of the 2006 Palestinian Legislative Council
Stanford Sloan Fellows